Mikhail Sidorov (born June 25, 1997) is a Russian professional ice hockey defenceman who currently plays for HC Neftekhimik Nizhnekamsk in the Kontinental Hockey League (KHL).

Playing career
Sidorov made his debut in the KHL with Ak Bars Kazan in the 2015–16 season.

After claiming the Gagarin Cup with Kazan in the 2017–18 season, Sidorov went down to Supreme Hockey League in the affiliated club Bars Kazan. Then he played with Lokomotiv Yaroslavl, Buran Voronezh and HC Kunlun Red Star.

Awards and honors

References

External links

1997 births
Living people
Ak Bars Kazan players
Bars Kazan players
Buran Voronezh players
Lokomotiv Yaroslavl players
HC Kunlun Red Star
HC Neftekhimik Nizhnekamsk
Russian ice hockey defencemen
Sportspeople from Yaroslavl